Chetab-e Olya (also Romanized as Chteāb-e ‘Olyā; also known as Chetāb-e Ḩoseyn Khān, Chetāb-e Ḩoseynkhānī and Chetāb-e Ḩoseyn Khānī) is a village in Garmeh-ye Jonubi Rural District, in the Central District of Meyaneh County, East Azerbaijan Province, Iran. At the 2006 census, its population was 466, in 109 families.

References 

Populated places in Meyaneh County